Two-Face Bang 2 is the sixth mixtape by American rapper Fredo Bang. It was released on April 15, 2022, by Se Lavi Productions, Def Jam Recordings. The mixtape features guest appearances from Roddy Ricch, Sleepy Hallow, Money Man, Rob49 and YNW Melly. The mixtape serves as a sequel to Fredo Bang's debut mixtape, 2 Face Bang.

Background
In March 2022, Fredo Bang officially announced the mixtape via his Instagram page, he requested ten thousand comments to release the album. On March 18, 2022, Fredo Bang posted the official artwork for the mixtape while asking his fans who to feature on the mixtape.

Track listing

Personnel

 Jess Jackson – mastering, mixing (13, 15, 16)
 Hardbody B-Eazy – mixing (1, 3, 4–6, 8–14, 16, 19)
 Ice “The Producer” – Audio engineer
 Călin Enache - Assistant Mastering Engineer (3)
 Dylan Jackson - Assistant Mastering Engineer (3)
 David Bone - Assistant Mastering Engineer (1, 3–7, 9–19)

Charts

References

2022 albums